Frank Brilando (June 29, 1925 – May 5, 2019) was an American cyclist. He competed at the 1948 and 1952 Summer Olympics.

References

External links
 

1925 births
2019 deaths
American male cyclists
Olympic cyclists of the United States
Cyclists at the 1948 Summer Olympics
Cyclists at the 1952 Summer Olympics
Cyclists from Chicago
20th-century American people